Perittia farinella is a moth of the family Elachistidae. It is found in most of Europe (except Ireland, Norway, the Iberian Peninsula, most of the Balkan Peninsula, Slovakia, Romania and Ukraine).

The wingspan is 12–14 mm.

The larvae probably feed on a species of the family Boraginaceae.

References

External links
 lepiforum.de

Elachistidae
Moths described in 1794
Moths of Europe
Taxa named by Carl Peter Thunberg